Eois pyrauges is a moth in the  family Geometridae. It is found on São Tomé.

References

Moths described in 1927
Eois
Moths of Africa